In computer architecture, 4-bit integers, or other data units are those that are 4 bits wide. Also, 4-bit central processing unit (CPU) and arithmetic logic unit (ALU) architectures are those that are based on registers, or data buses of that size. Memory addresses (and thus address buses) for 4-bit CPUs are generally much larger than 4-bit (since only 16 memory locations would be very restrictive), such as 12-bit or more, while they could in theory be 8-bit. A group of four bits is also called a nibble and has 24 = 16 possible values.

Some of the first microprocessors had a 4-bit word length and were developed around 1970. Traditional (non-quantum) 4-bit computers are by now obsolete, while recent quantum computers are 4-bit, but also based on qubits, such as the IBM Q Experience. See also: Bit slicing#Bit-sliced quantum computers.

The first commercial microprocessor was the binary-coded decimal (BCD-based) Intel 4004, developed for calculator applications in 1971; it had a 4-bit word length, but had 8-bit instructions and 12-bit addresses. It was succeeded by the Intel 4040.

The Texas Instruments TMS 1000 (1974) was a 4-bit CPU; it had a Harvard architecture, with an on-chip instruction ROM, 8-bit-wide instructions and an on-chip data RAM with 4-bit words.

The Rockwell PPS-4 was another early 4-bit processor, introduced in 1972, which had a long lifetime in handheld games and similar roles. It was steadily improved and by 1975 been combined with several support chips to make a one-chip computer.

The 4-bit processors were programmed in assembly language or Forth, e.g. "MARC4 Family of 4 bit Forth CPU" (which is now discontinued) because of the extreme size constraint on programs and because common programming languages (for microcontrollers, 8-bit and larger), such as the C programming language, do not support 4-bit data types (C, and C++, and more languages require that the size of the char data type be at least 8 bits, and that all data types other than bitfields have a size that is a multiple of the character size).

The 1970s saw the emergence of 4-bit software applications for mass markets like pocket calculators. During the 1980s, 4-bit microprocessors were used in handheld electronic games to keep costs low.

In the 1970s and 1980s, a number of research and commercial computers used bit slicing, in which the CPU's arithmetic logic unit (ALU) was built from multiple 4-bit-wide sections, each section including a chip such as an Am2901 or 74181 chip.

The Zilog Z80, although it is an 8-bit microprocessor, has a 4-bit ALU.

Although the Data General Nova is a series of 16-bit minicomputers, the original Nova and the Nova 1200 internally processed numbers 4 bits at a time with a 4-bit ALU,
sometimes called "nybble-serial".

The HP Saturn processors, used in many Hewlett-Packard calculators between 1984 and 2003  (including the HP 48 series of scientific calculators) are "4-bit" (or hybrid 64-/4-bit) machines; as the Intel 4004 did, they string multiple 4-bit words together, e.g. to form a 20-bit memory address, and most of the registers are 64 bits wide, storing 16 4-bit digits.

In addition, some early calculators such as the 1967 Casio AL-1000, the 1972 Sinclair Executive, and the aforementioned 1984 HP Saturn had 4-bit datapaths that accessed their registers 4 bits (one BCD digit) at a time.

While 4-bit CPUs/microcontrollers are very hard to find at sellers of semiconductors (including manufacturers' websites, since most if not all have discontinued), they can still be found "brand new" on Ebay.

Uses
While 32- and 64-bit processors are more prominent in modern consumer electronics, 4-bit CPUs can  be bought online at down to $0.21 unit price for "used" chips  (in bulk for 1000 units, or at $0.67  for low volume), while an 8-bit microcontroller can (or could in 2021) be bought for $0.24 for a single one (also obsolete; and a non-obsolete 8-bit CPUs can be bought for $0.30 per unit, for 702 units at $210.60), a fraction of the 4-bit price, and even a single modern 32-bit microcontroller can be bought for $0.24 and ARM-based down to  $0.72 in 2022, so it's unclear if 4-bit CPUs are still used for anything else than for replacement parts. For example, one bicycle computer specifies that it uses a "4 bit, 1-chip microcomputer". Other typical uses include coffee makers, infrared remote controls, and security alarms.

The processor in Barbie typewriters that can encrypt is a 4-bit microcontroller.

Details

With 4 bits, it is possible to create 16 different values. All single-digit hexadecimal numbers can be written with four bits. Binary-coded decimal is a digital encoding method for numbers using decimal notation, with each decimal digit represented by four bits.

List of 4-bit processors

 Intel 4004 (first 4-bit microprocessor from 1971, though Four-Phase Systems AL1 from 1969 is older, discontinued 1981)
 Intel 4040 (discontinued 1981)
 TMS 1000 (the first high-volume commercial microcontroller, from 1974, after Intel 4004; now discontinued)
 Atmel MARC4 core – (discontinued because of Low demand. "Last ship date: 7 March 2015")
 Samsung S3C7 (KS57 Series) 4-bit microcontrollers (RAM: 512 to 5264 nibbles, 6 MHz clock)
 Toshiba TLCS-47 series
 HP Saturn 
 NEC μPD75X
 NEC μCOM-4
 NEC (now Renesas) µPD612xA (discontinued), µPD613x, μPD6x and μPD1724x infrared remote control transmitter microcontrollers
 EM Microelectronic-Marin EM6600 family, EM6580, EM6682, etc.
 Epson S1C63 family
 National Semiconductor "COPS I" and "COPS II" ("COP400") 4-bit microcontroller families
 National Semiconductor MAPS MM570X
 Sharp SM590/SM591/SM595
 Sharp SM550/SM551/SM552
 Sharp SM578/SM579
 Sharp SM5E4
 Sharp LU5E4POP
 Sharp SM5J5/SM5J6
 Sharp SM530
 Sharp SM531
 Sharp SM500 (ROM 1197×8 bit, RAM 40×4 bit, a divider and 56-segment LCD driver circuit)
 Sharp SM5K1
 Sharp SM4A
 Sharp SM510 (ROM 2772×8 bit, RAM 128×4 bit, a divider and 132-segment LCD driver circuit)
 Sharp SM511/SM512 (ROM 4032×8 bit, RAM 128/142×4 bit, a divider and 136/200-segment LCD driver circuit)
 Sharp SM563

See also
 GMC-4
 Hitachi HD44780 - LCD controller with 4-bit mode
 Low Pin Count (LPC)

References

External links
 Saturn CPU
 
 Considerations for 4-bit processing

Data unit